Holy Trinity Church is an Anglican church in Port Chalmers, New Zealand. The church building is constructed in volcanic stone and has some fine stained glass, and is listed as a Category I Historic Place.
Together with St Barnabas Church, Warrington, Holy Trinity Church is part of the Port Chalmers-Warrington Parish of the Anglican Diocese of Dunedin, New Zealand.

History

Background
In its early years Port Chalmers was predominantly a Scots Presbyterian settlement, which required Anglicans to share places of worship with the Presbyterians. The first Anglican vicar resident in Otago was the Reverend J. A. Fenton, who arrived from England in 1852. With such a widespread geographical area to cover he was limited to holding services at Port Chalmers every six months.

By 1870 Congregationalists, Methodists (in 1855)  and Presbyterians in Port Chalmers had each built their own churches. By now the Anglicans were holding their services in the Masonic Hall at 29 Wickliffe Terrace and decided that it was time to establish  their own place of worship. In August 1870 R. H. Guise, on behalf of the Anglican community advertised in the Otago Daily Times for a suitable site.

The project was given further encouragement in 1871 when Samuel Nevill was consecrated as Anglican Bishop of Dunedin which in turn encouraged the development of new parishes and new churches with which to service them.
The Port Chalmers Anglican congregation formed a building committee, and the women organized fund raising, which lead to the committee being able to purchase for £150, a suitable commanding half-acre section on the corner of Grey and Scotia streets. After seeking plans and specifications from a number of different architects for a church large enough to seat 300 worshippers, the committee selected the design of R. A. Lawson.

Construction
Bishop Nevill laid the foundation stone on 7 June 1871, with full Masonic ceremony. The Bishop  spoke at the event in front of four to five hundred people, and again in the evening at the Masonic Hall.  The laying of the foundation stone was the Bishop's first official action in Dunedin. Soon after, the parish's first vicar, Reverend T. L. Stanley was ordained.
"From an early hour bunting was displayed from private houses and others in honour of the occasion.  The school children belonging to the Church, with their teachers, assembled at the Masonic Hall, the present place of worship... as also did the Ancient Order of Foresters... and members of the M.U.I.O.O.F. Lodge... the children, with flags and banners waving, taking precedence."
Construction was a drawn-out affair, and it wasn't until in 1873 when a Mr Borlase was contracted to complete the church that sufficient progress was made which allowed the church to be completed. The church was opened on 28 April 1874 at which the Bishop of Dunedin spoke to a congregation of 300, and congratulated Port Chalmers on its fifth place of worship, but stating, for the record, that of those other four places of worship: "unity would best be accomplished by the return of the Church's erring children to herself".
The first vicar of the church was the Rev. W. Leeson, who had been leading the congregation prior to the church being completed.  After three years of service he left in April 1876 for England after a valedictory service on 9 April 1876, in which he noted the difficulty he and his parishioners had faced in building the church:
	
"To their zealous co-operation was to be attributed the overcoming of the many difficulties that had beset the erection of the new church, which when he came amongst them was a mere  heap of stones, the foundation only laid.  Then they worshipped with no slight disadvantages at the Masonic Hall, but by dint of untiring perseverance in the good work they had put forth their hands to, had succeeded in raising for themselves a structure in honour of their Maker."

Evidently the association between the Masonic Lodge and Holy Trinity Church was on-going; the Otago Daily Times reporting a Masonic wedding taking place at the church in January 1878.

The Rev. Lorenzo Moore replaced Leeson and served until 1878, when he left after his offer to fund the building of a parsonage was rebuffed. The Rev. Moore was replaced by Rev. F. J. Sotham, from Oxford, England. 
The congregation proceeded to build a Sunday school hall and a bell tower, for which the bells were dedicated on 14 November 1879. This was the first belltower erected in the Dunedin Diocese.  The larger of the two bells had been sent from England three years earlier by the same Rev. Leeson who left in 1876, but had not been raised due to "financial difficulties".  The bell tower has since been demolished.

By 1879 the church's Sunday school had a roll of 116 students, with 50 girls and 40 boys in regular attendance.

Sotham left in 1880 to take up a role in Waikouaiti and was in turn replaced by Rev. Frederick Charles Platts.  The Rev. Platts came to the church from Sandridge, Victoria, Australia and was at work in Port Chalmers by May 1880.  His family of five arrived on the Arawata on 30 June 1880.  One of the Rev. Platts' children was Daisy Platts-Mills, who would go on to become one of the first female doctors in New Zealand.
On 1 December 1880, there was a fundraising event at the Foresters' Hall in Port Chalmers in order to raise money for a parsonage.

"The Hall presented a very pretty appearance, being tastefully decorated with flags, ferns and flowers; while nine tables were spread with an abundance of good things; supplied by the ladies of the congregation.  Indeed, each one seemed to vie with the other in the supply and decoration of the tables, so that in addition to a feast of creature comforts, there was a floral feast."

The Bishop of Dunedin spoke at the evening and suggested that the main reason for the high turnover of ministers at the church was the lack of a parsonage.  He urged the congregation to put aside any "petty feelings" and donate to this worthy cause.  Fundraising for the parsonage was evidently successful, for by November 1881 the parsonage had been built on land adjoining the church at a cost of £950.

"It is a solid, wooden two-storey structure of shapely proportions and exterior having a frontage of nearly 40 feet. The design is by Mr Allardyce, and the builders are Messrs Kermode and Murray. The house contains 12 rooms in all, and no pains have apparently been spared to have them equipped with all the adjuncts of domestic comfort."

The congregation's struggle to repay its debts incurred by its various construction projects eventually compelled them to sell the parsonage.

Rev. Platts remained the church's minister until shortly before his death on 28 May 1900, after 20 years of service.

Adding to the financial burden of its various building projects on the site, the roof of the church began to leak, causing ongoing maintenance expenses. This was eventually resolved in 1906, when the  Reverend Tewsley provided funds to re-roof the church and restore the chancel, among other improvements. The re-roofing with Marseilles tiles was undertaken in 1909.

Consecration
Once the church was debt free, it was consecrated on 6 October 1907.
In 1916, an organ was installed.
In 1981  the Sunday school was demolished. In 1987  the church was re-roofed with red coloured long run steel roofing.
The church was granted Heritage New Zealand historic place category 1 status on 2 July 1982.

References

Further reading

External links 
 Holy Trinity website.
 St Barnabas website.

Robert Lawson church buildings
Heritage New Zealand Category 1 historic places in Otago
Churches in Dunedin
Anglican churches in New Zealand
Listed churches in New Zealand
Churches completed in 1881
Port Chalmers
1870s architecture in New Zealand
Stone churches in New Zealand